Dipicolinic acid (pyridine-2,6-dicarboxylic acid or PDC and DPA) is a chemical compound which plays a role in the heat resistance of bacterial endospores. It is also used to prepare dipicolinato ligated lanthanide and transition metal complexes for ion chromatography.

Biological role 
Dipicolinic composes 5% to 15% of the dry weight of bacterial spores. It has been implicated as responsible for the heat resistance of the endospore, although mutants resistant to heat but lacking dipicolinic acid have been isolated, suggesting other mechanisms contributing to heat resistance are at work. Two genera of bacterial pathogens are known to produce endospores: the aerobic Bacillus and anaerobic Clostridium.

Dipicolinic acid forms a complex with calcium ions within the endospore core. This complex binds free water molecules, causing dehydration of the spore. As a result, the heat resistance of macromolecules within the core increases. The calcium-dipicolinic acid complex also functions to protect DNA from heat denaturation by inserting itself between the nucleobases, thereby increasing the stability of DNA.

The high concentration of DPA in and specificity to bacterial endospores has long made it a prime target in analytical methods for the detection and measurement of bacterial endospores. A particularly important development in this area was the demonstration by Rosen et al. of an assay for DPA based on photoluminescence in the presence of terbium, although this phenomenon was first investigated for using DPA in an assay for terbium by Barela and Sherry. Extensive subsequent work by numerous scientists has elaborated on and further developed this approach.

Environmental behavior
Simple substituted pyridines vary significantly in environmental fate characteristics, such as volatility, adsorption, and biodegradation.  Dipicolinic acid is among the least volatile, least adsorbed by soil, and most rapidly degraded of the simple pyridines.  A number of studies have confirmed dipicolinic acid is biodegradable in aerobic and anaerobic environments, which is consistent with the widespread occurrence of the compound in nature. With a high solubility (5g/liter) and limited sorption (estimated Koc = 1.86), utilization of dipicolinic acid as a growth substrate by microorganisms is not limited by bioavailability in nature.

See also
 Dinicotinic acid, an isomeric dicarboxylic acid
 2,6-Pyridinedicarbothioic_acid has both -COOH (carboxylic acid) groups replaced by -COSH (thiocarboxylic acid) groups

References

External links
 JPL Develops High-Speed Test to Improve Pathogen Decontamination at JPL.
 Spotting Spores at Astrobiology Magazine.

Pyridines
Dicarboxylic acids
Aromatic acids